Placar is a settlement north of Ptuj in northeastern Slovenia. It is part of the Municipality of Destrnik. The area is part of the traditional region of Styria and is now part of the Drava Statistical Region.

References

External links
Placar on Geopedia

Populated places in the Municipality of Destrnik